Jaan Rääts (15 October 1932 – 25 December 2020) was an Estonian composer who worked extensively on Estonian film scores of the 1960s and 1970s.

He was born in Tartu and became a member of the Estonian Composers' Union in 1957.

Compositions

Piano
 Sonata No. 1, Op. 11 No. 1 (1959)
 Sonata No. 2, Op. 11 No. 2 (1959)
 Sonata No. 3, Op. 11 No. 3 (1959)
 Sonata No. 4, Op. 36 "Quasi Beatles" (1969)
 Sonata No. 5, Op. 55
 Sonata No. 6, Op. 57
 Sonata No. 7, Op. 61
 Sonata No. 8, Op. 64
 Sonata No. 9, Op. 76 (1985, rev. 2014)
 Sonata No. 10, Op. 114 (2000, rev. 2014)
 24 Preludes for piano, Op. 33 (1968)
 24 Bagatelles for piano, Op. 50 
 24 prelüüdi eesti rahvaviisidele [24 Estonian Preludes] for piano, Op. 60  (1977)
 24 Marginalia for piano, Op. 65 (1982)
 24 Estonian Preludes for piano, Op. 80
 24 Estonian Preludes for piano, Op. 83
 4 for piano, Op. 125
 Prelüüd for piano, Op. 128 (2014)

Two pianos
 24 marginalia, for 2 pianos, Op. 68
 Sonata for 2 pianos, Op. 82 (1990)

Chamber music
 Meditation on a theme by Mozart for solo violin, Op. 94
 Pala kadentsiga (Piece with a Cadenza) for viola and piano (1981)
 Work for recorder in F major, Op. 103

With guitar
 Allegro for violin and guitar, Op. 93
 Music without title, for flute and guitar, Op. 107
 Trio for guitar, piano and percussion, Op. 121

Trios and quartets
 Trio No. 2, Op. 17
 Trio No. 4, Op. 56
 Trio No. 6, Op. 81
 Trio No. 7, Op. 125
 Kaleidoskopische, Études for clarinet, cello and piano, Op. 97 
 6 String Quartets (1955-1983)
 3 Piano Quintets (1957-1970)
 Quintet No. 3, Op. 38 (1970)
 Variations on a theme by Hanns Eisler for recorder, violin, cello, piano and harpsichord, Op. 62 (1978)
 Sextet for piano and winds, Op. 46 (1972)
 Sextet for 2 pianos and string quartet, Op. 84 (1990)
 Sextet for strings, Op. 98 (1997)
 Nonet, Op. 29 (1967)

Orchestra 
 Symphony No. 1, Op. 3 (1957)
 Symphony No. 2, Op. 8 (1958, rev. 1987 as Op. 79)
 Symphony No. 3, Op. 10 (1959)
 Symphony No. 4, Op. 13: Cosmique (1959)
 Symphony No. 5, Op. 28 (1966)
 Symphony No. 6, Op. 31 (1967)
 Symphony No. 7, Op. 47 (1972)
 Symphony No. 8, Op. 74 (1985)
 Ode for the first cosmonaut, symphonic poem Op. 14 (1961)
 Concerto for chamber orchestra No. 1, Op. 16 (1961)
 Concerto for chamber orchestra No. 2, Op. 78 (1987)
 Viis eskiisi reekviemile [5 sketches for a Requiem], Op. 100 (1996–97)
 Intrada for chamber orchestra, Op. 102 (1997) dedicated to the conductor Tõnu Kaljuste.

Ballet
 Virumaa: Suite for string orchestra and piano, Op. 115 (2000)

Concertos 
 Concerto for violin No. 1 and chamber orchestra with piano, Op. 21 (1963)
 Concerto for violin No. 2 and chamber orchestra with harpsichord, Op. 63 (1979)
 Concerto for violin No. 3 and chamber orchestra, Op. 96 (1995) dedicated to the German violinist Florian Meierott; Violin and organ version, Op. 96b
 Concerto for piano No. 1, Op. 34 (1968)
 Concerto for piano No. 2, Op. 70 (1983)
 Concerto for piano No. 3, Op. 83 (1990)
 Concerto for 2 pianos and orchestra, Op. 77 (1986)
 Concertino for piano and chamber orchestra, Op. 9 (1958)
 Concerto for piano and chamber orchestra, Op. 41 (1971)
 Concerto for cello No. 1, Op. 27 (1966)
 Concerto for cello No. 2, Op. 43 (1971)
 Concerto for cello No. 3, Op. 99 (1997)
 Concerto for guitar, string orchestra and prepared piano, Op. 88 (1992)
 Concerto for flute, guitar and orchestra, Op. 117 (2000)
 Concerto for 5, 3 trumpets, guitar, percussion and string orchestra with piano, Op. 120 (2002)
 Concerto for trumpet, piano and string orchestra, Op. 92 (1993)
 Concerto for violin and guitar (1998)
 Concerto for 2 guitars (1999)

Vocal music 
 Spring, oratorio on a Maïakovski text for children's choir and orchestra, Op. 15 (1961)
 Karl Marx, for speaking voice, choir and orchestra, Op. 18 (1962–64)
 School Cantata, for children's choir and orchestra, Op. 32 (1968)

Filmography
Ohtlikud mängud (1974)
Aeg elada, aeg armastada (1976)
Väike reekviem suupillile (1972)
Tuulevaikus (1971)
Gladiaator (1969)
Viini postmark (1967)
Tütarlaps mustas (1966)
Null kolm (1965)
Supernoova (1965)
Roosa kübar (1963)

References

External links

 
Jaan Rääts at the Estonian Music Information Centre
Jaan Rääts hommage webpage
Page at Onno van Rijen's site on Rääts' music

1932 births
2020 deaths
Estonian film score composers
Soviet film score composers
Male film score composers
Musicians from Tartu
20th-century Estonian composers
20th-century male musicians
Recipients of the Order of the White Star, 3rd Class